The Spice SE90C is a Group C1 and Group C2 sports prototype race car, designed, developed, and built by British manufacturer, Spice Engineering, for sports car racing in the World Sportscar Championship and IMSA GTP Championship, in 1990.

References

Sports prototypes
Group C cars